Blitzen may refer to:
 Blitzen,  one of Santa Claus' reindeer, as named in "The Night Before Christmas"
 Blitzen (computer), an SIMD (single instruction, multiple data) computer system
 Blitzen, a superhero from multiple Milestone Media comic books
 Blitzen, Oregon, a ghost town
 Blitzen, a dwarf in Magnus Chase and the Gods of Asgard

See also
 Blitz (disambiguation)
 Blitzkrieg